Melissa Giblon is a Canadian chess player who holds the position of two-time national champion in the Canadian Youth Chess Championships. She represented Canada five times within six years at the WYCC (World Youth Chess Championships). In addition, Giblon is a successful debater, and was crowned top speaker of the McGill Central Novice Championships. She is also known for sponsoring Syrian refugees within the York region.

Canadian Youth Chess Championship
Giblon has ranked two years as first place in the CYCC, first in 2009 in the U10 category, in 2011 in the U12 category, and then as a top-3 finisher four years in a row from 2009 to 2012.

World Youth Chess Championships
Giblon has represented Canada for five years at the WYCC, during 2007, 2009, 2010, 2011, and 2012 respectively.

Ontario Youth Chess Championship
She placed first three separate years at the OYCC (Ontario Youth Chess Championships), in 2007 in the U8 category, in 2009 competing in U10, and 2012 in U15, along with 7 consecutive years top 3 (2007–13).

Ontario Chess Challenge Finals
For four years Giblon was a top 10 finisher for her grade (2007-9, 13: grades 2-4, 8)

Canadian Women's Chess Championship
Giblon finished in 11th place in the national Canadian Women's Chess Championship in 2011.

Debating career
Giblon was crowned top speaker of the 2017 Canadian Central Novice Championships. She was also on the second-place breaking team, making it to the semi-finals. She was second in the 2017 Peel Debates, only following Ethan Jacob Curry.

References

1999 births
Canadian female chess players
Living people
Sportspeople from Toronto